Tikahtnu Commons is a 900,000 square foot power center located on a 95-acre parcel in Anchorage, Alaska, United States. It is owned by Cook Inlet Region, Inc. (CIRI), an Alaska Native corporation and Browman Development Company, a California corporation. The shopping center consists of several large anchor stores, dozens of smaller restaurants, shops and services, and a 16-screen Regal Cinemas theater. Tikahtnu is the word for Cook Inlet in the Dena'ina language.
Tikahtnu Commons is home to many firsts for Alaska, including the state's first Kohl's, PetSmart and IMAX theater. Tikahtnu Commons is the largest single-owner shopping center in the state and is even large by national comparison. Construction of the center began in 2007 and by the summer of 2015, it had been developed to roughly 98% capacity.

Tikahtnu Commons sits just 3 miles east of Glenn Square, which is another power center that was developed concurrently on the same stretch of freeway.

History
The northern portion of Muldoon Road evolved into one of the Anchorage area's major retail districts during the 1960s and 1970s, mainly due to the neighborhood's proximity to Elmendorf Air Force Base (EAFB) and Fort Richardson (which merged in 2010 to form JBER).  The tract of land on which Tikahtnu Commons sits was previously a part of EAFB.  This tract and other military lands in the northeast corner of the "Anchorage bowl" were ceded to CIRI as part of its entitlement under the Alaska Native Claims Settlement Act;  a tract to the east was developed as ANHC.  CIRI operated this tract as the Anchorage RV Park for over a decade before redeveloping it as a shopping area.

A number of factors influenced the development of Tikahtnu Commons. The Muldoon Road retail district had greatly expanded during the late 20th and early 21st century as a result of the construction of a Fred Meyer store at the intersection of Muldoon with DeBarr Road, Walmart's purchase of the property of a defunct construction company to the west of Fred Meyer, plus the redevelopment of the large Alaskan Village mobile home park to the south of those two properties into the Muldoon Town Center, including Begich Middle School. The location of Tikahtnu Commons along the Glenn Highway was also designed to attract shoppers from along the highway's corridor, owing to the failure of Eagle River's Valley River Center and Wasilla's Cottonwood Creek Mall. Both malls were crippled by Safeway's acquisition of competing chain Carrs Quality Centers and subsequent moves of those community's Safeway stores out of those malls and into existing Carrs locations. The Valley River Center was redeveloped as Eagle River's Town Center, while the Cottonwood Creek Mall was demolished and replaced with a Target store.

Tikahtnu Commons has replaced the Northway Mall and surrounding area as east Anchorage's major shopping district;  Red Robin and Sam's Club, among others, have closed their east Anchorage locations just to reopen at Tikahtnu Commons.  This repeats a pattern of decades prior, when the development of the Northway Mall and adjacent properties during the 1980s eclipsed the retail district along Mountain View Drive.  The Mountain View neighborhood boomed primarily during the 1950s and 1960s when Mountain View Drive served as the western end of the Glenn Highway, prior to the construction of the present-day freeway.  The Regal Cinemas also replaced the Fireweed Theatre in the northeast corner of midtown Anchorage, which opened in 1965, itself replacing cinemas in downtown Anchorage which were damaged or destroyed during the 1964 earthquake.  The Fireweed Theatre closed in 2010 and was subsequently demolished;  CIRI redeveloped the property at the same time as it was finishing development of Tikahtnu Commons.

Tikahtnu Commons sits just off the busy Glenn Highway at its intersection with Muldoon Road. The increased traffic drawn by the center has created concerns with the interchange of the two roads, which was built in the 1970s.  North Muldoon Road, formerly Oilwell Road, is used as the primary access to the shopping center, Bartlett High School, the Alaska Native Heritage Center (ANHC) and also leads to one of the gates of Joint Base Elmendorf–Richardson (JBER). Planners have begun preliminary work on a new interchange, which is tentatively scheduled to be constructed in 2016.

References

2007 establishments in Alaska
Buildings and structures in Anchorage, Alaska
Economy of Anchorage, Alaska
Power centers (retail) in the United States
Roadside attractions in Alaska
Shopping malls in Alaska
Tourist attractions in Anchorage, Alaska